Yuri  Nikolayevich Galtsev (born April 12, 1961, Kurgan) is a Russian entertainer and clownery, TV presenter, parodist, singer, theater, film and television actor. Honored Artist of the Russian Federation (2003). Art Director of the Raikin  Variety Theater  in St. Petersburg.

In 1988, he graduated from the Leningrad Institute of Theater, Music and Cinematography, with a degree in Music Speech Estrada, where he made friends with Gennady Vetrov.

Selected filmography
 Of Freaks and Men (1998) as  Impresario
 Streets of Broken Lights (1998, 2000, 2012) as  Yurik, singer, Eduard Zaslavsky
 Deadly Force (2000) as  expert Yuri  
 Empire under Attack (2000) as  Alexander Iosifovich Frank
 Dead Man's Bluff (2005) as  Sergei (voice)
 Yeralash (2006) as teacher of history
 Kingdom of Crooked Mirrors 92007) as Abag
 Hitler Goes Kaput! (2008) as Gruppenführer Heinrich Müller
 The Best Movie 2 (2009) as herald
 Rzhevsky Versus Napoleon (2012) as mayor
Sheep and Wolves (2016) as Ziko (voice)
Koschey: The Everlasting Story (2021) as  Vodyanoy (voice)

References

External links

 Yuri Galtsev at the Last.fm

1961 births
Living people
People from Kurgan, Kurgan Oblast
Soviet male film actors
Soviet stage actors
Russian male film actors
Russian stage actors
Russian male television actors
Russian male voice actors
Soviet male singers
Russian male comedians
Russian clowns
Russian television presenters
Russian parodists
Honored Artists of the Russian Federation
Russian State Institute of Performing Arts alumni
Russian satirists